Samedi de rire was a Radio-Canada sketch comedy show in Quebec that aired from 1985 to 1989. Cast members of the series included Yvon Deschamps and Normand Brathwaite. The québécois analogue to Saturday Night Live, the title is itself a clever play on words: it literally means "Saturday of laughs", but is phonetically pronounced similar to ça me dit de rire, or "I feel like laughing".

See also
List of Quebec television series
List of Quebec comedians
Television of Quebec
Culture of Quebec

Television shows filmed in Quebec
Ici Radio-Canada Télé original programming
1985 Canadian television series debuts
1989 Canadian television series endings
1980s Canadian sketch comedy television series